Josef Krainer junior (26 August 1930, Graz, Austria – 30 December 2016, Graz, Austria) was an Austrian politician and Governor of Styria from 1981 to 1996. He was the son of Governor Josef Krainer senior and a member of the Austrian People's Party.

See also
List of governors of Styria

References

1930 births
2016 deaths
Governors of Styria